Elmer and Elsie is a 1934 American comedy film directed by Gilbert Pratt and written by Humphrey Pearson. The film stars George Bancroft, Frances Fuller, Roscoe Karns, George Barbier, Nella Walker and Charles Sellon. The film was released on August 4, 1934, by Paramount Pictures.

Plot

Cast 
George Bancroft as Elmer Beebe
Frances Fuller as Elsie Beebe
Roscoe Karns as Rocky Cott
George Barbier as John Kincaid
Nella Walker as Mrs. Eva Kincaid
Charles Sellon as George Simpson
Helena Phillips Evans as Ma Simpson
Ruth Clifford as Mamie
Albert Conti as Barlotti
Floyce Brown as Anna
Vera Steadman as Blanche
Helen Lynch as Ruby
Marie Wells as Mabel
Tom Dempsey as Joe
Eddie Baker as Evans
Duke York as Smith
William Robyns as Al
Alfred P. James as Postman

References

External links 
 

1934 films
American comedy films
1934 comedy films
Paramount Pictures films
Films directed by Gilbert Pratt
American black-and-white films
1930s English-language films
1930s American films